Karl Samuel Lewkowicz is a musical theatre composer and lyricist from London.

Biography
KS Lewkowicz lives and works in London, where he has a close ongoing working relationship with the Arcola Theatre in London's Off West End, the theatre where most of his writing has been developed and produced. Most recently with playwright Amy Rosenthal he wrote the music and lyrics for The Queen and I – a musical about Queen Victoria and her close relationship with her Indian servant. The first reading of The Queen and I took place in August 2015 at Arcola theatre as part of their Grimeborn festival, followed by a second reading in August 2016 funded by an Arts Council grant. The musical is currently being developed by the Arcola theatre.

His previous musical –  also with Judith Johnson – was Release The Beat, a musical adaptation of A Midsummer Night's Dream, set in London's nightclubs and combining hip hop and house music rhythms, the show had its world premiere at the Arcola Theatre in 2004.

He provided additional lyrics and musical supervision for a musical adaptation of the Turkish novel Mutuluk (Bliss) by O.Z. Livaneli. The musical was produced and performed at the Arcola Theatre  as well as theatres in Germany and Turkey from March to May 2017 with Mehmet Ergen directing.

Other writing includes music and lyrics for an adaptation of  Lewis Carroll's Jabberwocky for the Arcola Theatre aimed at school children in Dalston and Hackney, a musical adaptation of Graham Greene's Brighton Rock, and improvised scenes for London's Paddington Arts Youth Theatre Group, directed by Mehmet Ergen and Ray Shell.

He was invited to participate in the inaugural Theatre Royal Stratford East Musical Theatre Workshop. The workshop brings together writers  from various disciplines to spend 4 weeks writing together under the auspices of tutors from New York's Tisch School Musical Theatre course.

References

British composers
Living people
Year of birth missing (living people)